Jason Rother (July 16, 1969 – August 31, 1988) was a 19-year-old United States Marine Corps lance corporal who was abandoned in the harsh Mojave Desert during a training exercise, causing his death from dehydration and exposure. His death is now commonly used as a lesson taught to members of the military about the importance of accountability and responsibility.

Death

Rother was assigned to Kilo Company, Third Battalion, Second Marine Regiment, Second Marine Division (K 3/2) based out of Camp Lejeune, North Carolina. In August 1988, the unit was sent to the massive Marine Corps Air Ground Combat Center Twentynine Palms (MCAGCC) for desert warfare training in the Mojave desert. 1stLt Allen Lawson, a native of Flint, Michigan, was assigned the task of posting road guides on the night of August 30, 1988, along the route position of a battalion night movement exercise. Lawson disobeyed the order to place road guides in pairs, got lost, forgot where he had placed LCpl Rother, and upon the completion of the exercise failed to mention that Rother was missing, as did two sergeants responsible for LCpl Rother, Sgts Thomas Turnell, and Christopher Clyde. Over 40 hours had passed without anyone in the battalion knowing or saying that Rother was missing, when an armory weapons inventory got the chain of command's attention due to LCpl Rother's weapon not having been returned.

Several searches were launched with over 1,000 Marines on foot, helicopters, and thermal imaging gear. Rother was not carrying a map or compass, had very little water, and weighed only . The first search discovered he had left behind some of his gear and made an arrow out of stones where he had originally been dropped off. That search, and several others,   failed to locate him. LCpl Rother's remains would not be found until December 4, four months after his disappearance. All that was left were skeletal remains. It was believed that Rother likely died less than 24 hours before the first search was launched and that the temperature on the day had reached .

Fallout

The Marine Corps commandant, General Alfred M. Gray Jr. ordered an outside investigation which resulted in the courts-martial of 1stLt Lawson, finding him guilty of dereliction of duty and sentenced to discharge and four months' confinement in the brig.

See also
 Ribbon Creek incident 
 Lee Mirecki incident 
 Kurkse tragedy

References

Further reading

United States military scandals
Scandals in the United States
Military education and training in the United States
United States Marine Corps in the 20th century
United States Marines
1988 in military history
1969 births
1988 deaths
August 1988 events in the United States
1988 in California